Small Rain: Verses From The Bible is a 1943 picture book by James Orton Jones and illustrated by Elizabeth Orton Jones. The book has illustrated verses from the King James Bible. The book was a recipient of a 1944 Caldecott Honor for its illustrations.

References

1943 children's books
American picture books
Caldecott Honor-winning works
Viking Press books